Structural Damage is the sixth studio album by the guitarist Steve Morse, released on March 14, 1995, by High Street Records.

Track listing

Personnel
Steve Morse – guitar, mixing, producer
Van Romaine – drums, percussion
Dave LaRue – bass, mixing, producer
Nigel Walker – engineering
Michael Fuller – mastering

References

Steve Morse albums
1995 albums